Wingreen is the surname of the following people
Ivan Wingreen (1961–2014), South African cricketer
Jason Wingreen (1920–2015), American actor
Ned Wingreen, American theoretical physicist

See also
Meir-Wingreen Formula, describes electric current as mesoscopic system